Sentimental Sing Along with Mitch is an album by Mitch Miller & The Gang. It was released in 1960 on the Columbia label (catalog nos. CL-1457 and CS-8251).

The album debuted on Billboard magazine's popular albums chart on June 27, 1960, peaked at No. 5, and remained on that chart for 32 weeks. It was certified as a gold record by the RIAA.

Track listing
Side 1
 Medley: "Singin' In The Rain", "All I Do Is Dream Of You", and "Toot, Toot, Tootsie! (Goodbye)" [3:19]
 The Gang That Sang "Heart Of My Heart" (B. Ryan) {2:32]
 Medley: "Little Annie Rooney" and "Hello! My Baby" [2:32]
 Medley: "Our Boys Will Shine Tonight" and "Give My Regards To Broadway" [2:13]
 Medley: "While Strolling Through The Park One Day" and "Ida" [2:08]
 "When The Saints Come Marching In"

Side 2
 "Jeannine (I Dream Of Lilac Time)" (N. Shilkret, L.W. Gilbert) [2:50]
 "Just A-Wearyin' For You" (C. Jacobs-Bond, F.L. Stanton) [3:38]
 "I'll See You In My Dreams" (G. Kahn, I. Jones) [2:53]
 "When I Grow Too Old To Dream" (O. Hammerstein II, S. Romberg) [2:52]
 "Jeanie With The Light Brown Hair" (S. Foster) [4:14]
 "Three O'Clock In The Morning" (D. Terriss, J. Robledo) [2:33]

References

1960 albums
Columbia Records albums
Mitch Miller albums